The 2019 Speedway of Nations was the second FIM Speedway of Nations. The competition consisted of two race-off events and a two-legged final. The event was won by Russia for the second consecutive year. They beat Poland in the Grand Final with Australia taking the bronze medal.

Format

The 2019 Speedway of Nations was a pairs event, with each nation being represented by two senior riders and one rider under the age of 21. Each meeting was staged over 21 heats with the scores from each rider added together to give a total for each nation.

The two race-off events consisted of seven teams, with three qualifying for the final. The final, which included hosts and defending champions Russia, was staged over two legs with the scores from each added together. The top scoring nation went straight through to the Grand Final, while the second and third placed nations competed in the final qualifier for the chance to reach the Grand Final. The final qualifier and Grand Final were one-off heats. 

The winner of the Grand Final determined the overall winner of the 2019 Speedway of Nations.

Race Off 1
  Landshut
 May 4

Race Off 2
  Manchester
 May 11

Final
  Tolyatti, Anatoly Stepanov Stadium

First leg
 July 20

Second leg
 July 21

Total

Grand Final Qualifier

Grand Final

See also
 2019 Speedway Grand Prix
 motorcycle speedway
 2019 in sports

References

2019
Speedway of Nations
Speedway of Nations
Speedway of Nations
Speedway of Nations